Velates is an extinct  genus of marine gastropod mollusks belonging to the family Neritidae.

These snails lived from Paleocene to the Miocene (age range: from 58.7 to 11.608 million years ago). Fossil shells within this genus have been found all over the world.

Species
Species within this genus include:
 † Velates balkanicus  Bontscheff, 1896
 † Velates californicus  Vokes, 1935
 † Velates perversus  Gmelin, 1791
 † Velates rogeri  Abbass, 1967
 † Velates rugatus  Abbass, 1967
 † Velates tebanensis  Abbass, 1967
 † Velates vizcainoensis  Cushing Woods & Saul, 1986
 † Velates vokesi  Cooke, 1946

Description
The earliest regular windings are visible at the top of the shell.

References

External links

 Cyril Walker & David Ward (1993) - Fossielen: Sesam Natuur Handboeken, Bosch & Keuning, Baarn. 
 ALAN J. CUSHING WOODS AND L. R. SAUL NEW NERITIDAE FROM SOUTHWESTERN NORTH AMERICA
 István Főzy, István Szente, Gareth Dyke Gastropod of the Genus Velates from the Florida Eocene

 
Paleocene first appearances
Miocene genus extinctions
Paleogene molluscs